Springeratus polyporatus is a species of clinid native to the waters around the Indian Ocean islands of Réunion and Mauritius where it can be found from the surface to  in depth.  It can reach a maximum length of  SL.

References

External links
 Photograph

polyporatus
Fish described in 1972
Taxa named by Thomas H. Fraser